The men's 200 metre breaststroke competition at the 1999 Pan Pacific Swimming Championships took place on August 25–26 at the Sydney International Aquatic Centre.  The last champion was Kurt Grote of US.

This race consisted of four lengths of the pool, all in breaststroke.

Records
Prior to this competition, the existing world and Pan Pacific records were as follows:

Results
All times are in minutes and seconds.

Heats
The first round was held on August 25.

Semifinals
The semifinals were held on August 25.

Final 
The final was held on August 26.

References

1999 Pan Pacific Swimming Championships